Tofig or Tofiq is an Azerbaijani masculine given name, equivalent to the Arabic name Tawfik. It may refer to:

 Tofig Aghahuseynov (1923–2021), Soviet-Azerbaijani colonel general
 Tofiq Bahramov (1925–1993), Soviet footballer and football referee from Azerbaijan
 Tofig Bakikhanov (born 1930), Azerbaijani composer
 Tofig Gasimov (1938–2020), Azerbaijani politician and diplomat
 Tofig Guliyev (1917–2000), Azerbaijani composer, pianist and conductor
 Tofig Huseynov (1954–1992), Azerbaijani officer and National Hero of Azerbaijan
 Tofig Huseynzade (1946–2006), Armenian-born Azerbaijani philologist, folklorist, journalist and poet
 Tofig Ismayilov (film director) (1939–2016), Azerbaijani film director, screenwriter and film scholar
 Tofig Ismayilov (politician) (1933–1991), first Secretary of State of Azerbaijan
 Tofig Javadov (1925—1963), Azerbaijani painter
 Tofig Kocharli (1929–2007), Soviet and Azerbaijani historian and deputy of the Supreme Soviet of Azerbaijan SSR
 Tofig Mammadov (born 1980), Azerbaijani Paralympic judoka
 Tofig Yagublu (born 1961), Azerbaijani politician, journalist
 Tofig Zulfugarov (born 1959), Azerbaijani politician, former Minister of Foreign Affairs of Azerbaijan

Azerbaijani masculine given names